was a Japanese film director known for his critically acclaimed, award-winning Roman Porno films, such as Ichijo's Wet Lust (1972) and The Woman with Red Hair (1979). He was the most highly acclaimed director of the early Nikkatsu Roman Porno era, with many box-office successes, and films regularly appearing on the yearly Best Ten lists of the mainstream Kinema Junpo and Eiga Geijutsu film journals. Kumashiro has been called, "the most consistently successful director in Japan's cinematic history," and Allmovie calls him, "arguably the most important Japanese director to emerge during the 1970s."

Life and career

Early life
Tatsumi Kumashiro was born on April 24, 1927 in Saga, on Kyūshū—the southernmost of Japan's four main islands.  His father was a pharmaceuticals merchant and judo master descended from the samurai class. A strict disciplinarian, Kumashiro's father believed in the warrior philosophy of Yamamoto Tsunetomo as written in Hagakure and supported Japan's military exploits of the 1930s and 1940s. Early in life Kumashiro rebelled against this upbringing by immersing himself in film and Western literature. During World War II, Kumashiro entered medical school as a means of avoiding the draft, but dropped out as soon as the war ended in Japan's defeat. He studied English literature at Waseda University, but, deciding he could not make a living writing novels, entered Shochiku studio as an assistant director in 1952, and moved to Nikkatsu in 1955.

Kumashiro worked as an assistant director and screenwriter until he was finally given a chance to direct in 1968. His debut film, Front Row Life, told the story of a stripper and her daughter who wished to join her mother's profession. The star of the movie, Hatsue Tonooka, became Kumashiro's wife later in the year, though the marriage ended in divorce within a few months. Front Row Life anticipated Kumashiro's later career in its focus on striptease performers. The film was a critical success, but because it failed at the box-office Nikkatsu put Kumashiro's directing career on hold again.

Directorial success
"My films are about people not biology."-- Tatsumi Kumashiro
In 1971, facing bankruptcy due to a loss of their audience to television, Nikkatsu decided to devote its facilities almost exclusively to theatrical soft-core pornography. Several directors, not wishing to work in pornography, left the studio, opening up vacant positions.

Nikkatsu gave its Roman porno directors a great deal of artistic freedom in their films, as long as they met the official minimum quota of four nude or sex scenes per hour. In this environment, at the age of 44, Kumashiro was given his second chance to direct. Though his later films took full advantage of Nikkatsu's lenient policies by experimenting with cinematic time and space in an almost surreal manner, his first Roman porno, Wet Lips (Nureta Kuchibiru) (1972), was fairly simplistic. However, this story of a prostitute and her lover on the run after killing her pimp proved to be a major critical and box-office success, and established Kumashiro's directorial career. Wet Lips was also the first of Kumashiro's many films to use the word "Wet" (nureta) in the title.

His next film, Ichijo's Wet Lust (1972) was another hit with the critics and the public. Japan's most famous sex performer of the time, Sayuri Ichijō, played the title role for which she won the important Kinema Jumpo prize for best actress. Accepting the best director and best script awards at the same ceremony, Kumashiro commented, "If I can shoot what I like without the pressure of how it will turn out, I am motivated."

Mid career
For the next 20 years, Kumashiro directed a string of financial and critical hits unprecedented in Japanese cinematic history, completing ten films in 1972 and 1973 alone. His prolific and successful career during these years earned him the title, "King of Nikkatsu Roman porno" Contrasting him with more mainstream filmmakers like Nagisa Oshima, who sometimes make use of pornographic elements in their films, Film Quarterly’s New York editor, William Johnson calls Kumashiro, "an indisputable maker of screen porn whose films also deserve 'serious' interest." Kumashiro's work was noted for its humanistic themes and for its sympathetic treatment of its characters. Stylistically, his films were experimental, using a variety of avant-garde cinematic devices, and complex narrative structure.

Woods are Wet: Woman Hell (1973) was an adaptation of the Marquis de Sade's Justine (1791). Jasper Sharp writes that Kumashiro uses de Sade's story as a platform for criticizing morality imposed by power, with particular relevance to the censorship trial Nikkatsu was undergoing at the time with the prosecution of Love Hunter (1972). Underlying this theme, common in Kumashiro's work, Kumashiro has one of his characters say, "What you accept as ethical is contrived by those in authority so they can control people." Kumashiro also employs censorship as one of the stylistic devices of the film, exaggerating the fogging required by Japanese law by placing black blocks over large areas of the screen.

Lovers Are Wet and The World of Geisha (both 1973) were two more films in which Kumashiro similarly used the censor's tools to make an anti-censorship statement. François Truffaut called The World of Geisha (1973) a "great movie," adding, "The acting is perfect, and the film is humorous. In its praise for female beauty and derision for male stupidity lies the generous spirit of Jean Renoir." Street of Joy a.k.a. Red Light District: Gonna Get Out (1974), employing the same setting as Mizoguchi's Street of Shame (1956), illustrates Kumashiro's common use of devices such as internal animated sequences to situate characters, and enka songs to comment on the action.

Kumashiro's 1974 film, Man and Woman Behind the Fusuma Screen: Enduring Skin (Yojo-han Fusuma No Urabari: Shinobi Hada) starred Nikkatsu's reigning Roman porno Queen, Junko Miyashita. Movie critic Tadao Sato called the film "a masterful porno film rich in emotion, anarchy, and nihilism." Junko Miyashita won the Hochi News award for best actress of 1979 after starring in Kumashiro's Woman with Red Hair (Akai Kami No Onna) (1979), which the Weissers, in their Japanese Cinema Encyclopedia: The Sex Films call "one of the very best Nikkatsu pink films." Uncharacteristically for Kumashiro, Woman with Red Hair has a straightforward narrative structure, but Jasper Sharp writes that it is still a "difficult" film for viewers who are not familiar with Kumashiro's work. The story, in which a sexually voracious woman comes to live with a construction worker, can be read either as a male fantasy, or as a story of a woman's search for sexual satisfaction. Roughly one-third of the film takes place in the bedroom, with the claustrophobic atmosphere heightened by such exterior sounds as moaning from neighboring drug addicts, and non-stop rain.  Sharp writes that it is perhaps best interpreted as "out-and-out fantasy".

Kumashiro also took breaks from the Roman Porno genre to direct mainstream films, beginning with Bitterness of Youth (1974), a story of student radicalism with similarities to Dreiser's An American Tragedy (1925). Other such films include Light of Africa (1975) for Toho and Jigoku (1979), a remake of Nobuo Nakagawa's 1960 film Jigoku, for Toei. For the German-Japanese co-production, The Woman with the Red Hat (1982), Kumashiro worked with Pink Film producer-director Kōji Wakamatsu. The production was an unsuccessful attempt on Wakamatsu's part to emulate the success he had had in collaborating with the French in Nagisa Ōshima's In the Realm of the Senses (1976). The story, dealing with a Japanese man in Germany and his obsessive sexual relationship with a German woman during Hitler's rise to power, also seemed to echo Ōshima's film. Jasper Sharp notes with surprise that Kumashiro, who had long been an opponent of Japanese censorship, did not take advantage of the more liberal European laws. Instead he followed the Japanese practice of obscuring genital areas with props.

Death
Throughout his life Kumashiro was a frail and sickly man. In the 1980s, as the rising AV (Adult Video) industry took away most of the audience for the theatrical Roman pornos, Kumashiro's health began failing. He suffered from a collapsed lung in 1983, but, in spite of his poor health, he continued making films until his death. He directed his last two films, Like a Rolling Stone (Bo no Kanashimi) (1994) and Immoral: Indecent Relations (1995) while using an oxygen tank. He died of heart and lung failure on February 24, 1995.

Kumashiro is remembered with affection by those who worked with him, and is considered one of the best directors to have worked in the Roman Porno series. When interviewed for the British television program, Mondo Macabro, actress Kazuko Shirakawa observed that it may have been Kumashiro's poor physical condition which helped him to portray the fragility of human existence. The Japanese film critic and filmmaker Chiseko Tanaka summarized his career with, "Kumashiro was not a great poet like Mizoguchi, Imamura and Oshima. He was a little poet, but he was unique. He devoted himself to his works as a true artist."

Filmography
  (1968-04-13)
  (1972-01-29)
  (1972-10-07)
  (1973-03-24)
  (1973-05-23)
  (1973-07-14)
  (1973-11-03)
  (1974-01-03)
  (1974-02-16)
  (1974-05-04)
  (1974-06-29)
  (1974-09-21)
 宵待草 (Yoimachigusa, 1974-12-28)
 櫛の火 (Kushi no Hi, 1975-04-05)
  (1975-06-21)
  (1975-08-09)
  (1975-12-24)
  (1977-02-01)
  (1977-04-23)
  (1979-02-17)
  (1979-06-03)
  (1979-11-03)
  (1980-03-29)
  (1980-11-21)
  (1980-12-20)
  (1981-10-23)
  (1982-10-16)
  (1983-06-18)
  (1984-04-20)
  (1985-10-05)
  (1986-10-25)
  (1987-04-25)
  (1988-07-01)
  (1994-10-01)
  (1995-04-25)

See also
 List of Nikkatsu Roman Porno films

Notes

Sources
 
 "FILMOGRAPHY: Director Tatsumi Kumashiro (1927–1995)" in A Woman with Red Hair: A film by Tatsumi Kumashiro. (2003) Kimstim Collection DVD; Nikkatsu, Kino Video, Kimstim, Inc. KS2012.

External links
  (Notes on "A Tatsumi Kumashiro Retrospective" in New York, presented by the Japan Society, January 19 - March 28, 2001
  (2nd page)

1927 births
1995 deaths
Japanese film directors
Pink film directors
People from Saga Prefecture